Robert MacLaurin (born 1961) is a Scottish artist.

Biography

Robert MacLaurin was born in London in June 1961.  His early influence was Arnold Balmer his art teacher at Woodleigh School. He studied art at Edinburgh College of Art, graduating with distinction.

MacLaurin was part of a movement focused around the 369 Gallery in Edinburgh, alongside Fionna Carlisle, June Redfern, Ian Hughes, Caroline McNairn and Gwen Hardie. Since receiving his Sir Robert Menzies Fellowship, he lives in Castlemaine, Victoria, Australia.

Awards and distinctions

 Sir Robert Menzies Fellowship, Menzies Foundation, 1995
 Noble Grossart Scottish Painting Prize, 1998
 John Farrell Self Portrait Award, Castlemaine Art Museum, 2005

Museums and galleries

 City of Edinburgh Council
 National Galleries of Scotland
 The Fleming Collection
 University of Edinburgh
 Castlemaine Art Museum

Exhibitions

MacLaurin's exhibitions include:

 Mercury Gallery, Edinburgh, 1987
 369 Gallery, Edinburgh, 1989
 Benjamin Rhodes Gallery, London, 1991, 1993
 Glasgow Print Studio, 1995
 Niagara Galleries, Melbourne, 1998
 Edinburgh International Festival, 1999
 Berkeley Square Gallery, London, 1990, 1997, 1999, 2001, 2003
 Osborne Samuel Gallery, London, 2006, 2008
 Australian Galleries, Melbourne, 2012
 Open Eye Gallery, Edinburgh, 2016

References

External links
Website

1965 births
Scottish artists
Living people